The My World Tour was the debut concert tour by Canadian singer Justin Bieber. It is Bieber's first concert tour which supports his two-part debut EP and debut studio album My World (2009) and My World 2.0 (2010). The tour was officially announced on March 16, 2010, a week before My World 2.0 was released. The tour has multiple legs with the supporting acts of Mindless  Behavior, Sean Kingston and Jessica Jarrell on North American dates and pop girl group The Stunners also joined the tour for the first twenty dates. Jasmine Villegas joined the tour as the opening act for the second leg. The first leg of the tour is estimated to have grossed $35.6 million post inflation. The tour grossed over $53 million worldwide according to Jeetendr Sehdev of The Guardian.

Announcement

The tour was officially announced on March 16, 2010, a week before the release of his debut studio album, My World 2.0. In an interview with the Houston Chronicle, when asked about what fans could expect on the tour, Bieber stated, "I want to show that I love to perform. There are going to be some cool tricks, some electronic things that haven't been seen before, for sure."

Setlist

"Love Me"
"Bigger"
"U Smile"
"Runaway Love"
"Never Let You Go"
"Favorite Girl"
"One Less Lonely Girl"
"Somebody to Love"
"Overboard"
"Never Say Never"
"Up"
"One Time"
"That Should Be Me"
"Wanna Be Startin' Somethin'" / "Walk This Way" 
"Eenie Meenie"
"Down to Earth"
"Baby"

Setlist per official tour book.

Tour dates

Recordings and broadcasting

All concerts were professionally filmed for venue projection because of the audience in back rows, but filmed with just one angle. The concert in New York City, United States on August 31, 2010 was filmed with different cameras and many angles for Bieber's 3D movie, Justin Bieber: Never Say Never.

The October 8, 2011 concert in São Paulo, Brazil was filmed with different cameras and angles professionally. Later, this concert was broadcast on television in Brazil but some songs are skipped.

References

External links
 Justin Bieber : News : Tickets for "My World" Tour

2010 concert tours
2011 concert tours
Justin Bieber concert tours